The 2021–22 Big 12 men's basketball season began with practices in October 2020, followed by the start of the 2021–22 NCAA Division I men's basketball season in November. Regular season conference play began in November 2021 and concludes in March 2022. The 2022 Big 12 men's basketball tournament was held March 9–12, 2022, at the T-Mobile Center in Kansas City, Missouri.

Baylor won their first ever National Championship in 2021, becoming the first Big 12 team to win the National Championship since Kansas in 2008. Kansas would make it two straight national championships for the conference, defeating North Carolina, 72-69, in the finals.

Coaches

Coaching changes

Head coaches 
Note: Stats are through the beginning of the season. All stats and records are from time at current school only.

Preseason

Recruiting classes

Preseason watchlists 
Below is a table of notable preseason watch lists. 

Big 12 Preseason Poll

Pre-Season All-Big 12 Team

Player of the Year: Remy Martin, Kansas
Newcomer of the Year: Marcus Carr, Texas
Freshman of the Year: Kendall Brown, Baylor

Preseason national polls

Rankings

Regular season

Conference matrix 

Through games of March 5, 2022

Multi-Team Events

Big 12 - Big East Battle

Big 12/SEC Challenge

Players of the Week

Record vs Other Conferences 
The Big 12 had record of 119–28 in non-conference play.

Postseason

Big 12 tournament

Bracket

NCAA tournament

The winner of the Big 12 tournament, Kansas, received the conference's automatic bid to the NCAA tournament. Six Big 12 teams received bids to the NCAA tournament.

Honors and awards

All-Americans 

To earn "consensus" status, a player must win honors from a majority of the following teams: the 
Associated Press, the USBWA, Sporting News, and the National Association of Basketball Coaches.

James Akinjo also received third team All-American honors from the AP, ISBWA, Sporting News and NABC.

All-Big 12 awards and teams 

Honorable Mention: Matthew Mayer (Baylor), Jeremy Sochan (Baylor), Dajuan Harris Jr. (Kansas), Markquis Nowell (Kansas State), Umoja Gibson (Oklahoma), Jordan Goldwire (Oklahoma), Tanner Groves (Oklahoma), Elijah Harkless (Oklahoma), Damion Baugh (TCU), Emanuel Miller (TCU), Christian Bishop (Texas), Andrew Jones (Texas), Courtney Ramey (Texas), Adonis Arms (Texas Tech), Kevin McCullar (Texas Tech), Kevin Obanor (Texas Tech), Marcus Santos-Silva (Texas Tech), Sean McNeil (West Virginia)

Notes

References